Colleen M. Garry (born July 21, 1962, in Lowell, Massachusetts) is an American politician who represents the 36th Middlesex District in the Massachusetts House of Representatives.

Early life and education 
Garry was born on July 21, 1962, in Lowell Massachusetts. She graduated from the University of Lowell and Suffolk University Law School.

Career 
She was an aide to State Representative John Cox, who represented Dracut and part of Lowell.  In 1994 she was elected to represent a new district consisting of Dracut, Tyngsborough, and Dunstable.  Dunstable has since been transferred to a neighboring district so the current district consists only of Dracut and Tyngsborough.  She is a conservative member of the House Democratic Caucus.

In 2015, Representative Garry came under fire for comments criticizing an act of civil disobedience which obstructed a major Massachusetts highway. Representative Garry accused protestors affiliated with the Black Lives Matter movement of being "terrorists" and claimed that "structural racism is a fraud."

See also
 2019–2020 Massachusetts legislature
 2021–2022 Massachusetts legislature

References

1962 births
People from Dracut, Massachusetts
Politicians from Lowell, Massachusetts
University of Massachusetts Lowell alumni
Suffolk University Law School alumni
Living people
Democratic Party members of the Massachusetts House of Representatives
Women state legislators in Massachusetts
21st-century American politicians
21st-century American women politicians